Events in the year 1985 in Germany.

Incumbents
President - Richard von Weizsäcker
Chancellor – Helmut Kohl

Events 
 15–26 February - 35th Berlin International Film Festival
 21 March - Germany in the Eurovision Song Contest 1985
 1985 diethylene glycol wine scandal
 The Union for Aromanian Language and Culture, an Aromanian cultural organization, is founded by the Aromanian professor  at Freiburg im Breisgau.

Births

 January 7 - Tiger Kirchharz, German dancer
 March 25 - Luise Heyer, German actress
 April 8 - Patrick Schliwa, German rugby player
 April 9 - Tim Bendzko, German singer-songwriter
 April 28 - Lucas Jakubczyk, German athlete
 May 6 - Theresa Underberg, German actress
 June 1 - Prince Christian of Hanover
 June 4 - Lukas Podolski, German football player
 June 20 
Kai Hesse, footballer
Halil Savran, footballer
Katharina Schulze, politician
 June 27 - Nico Rosberg, Formula One racing driver 
 July 10 - Mario Gómez, German football player
 August 27 - Daniel Küblböck, German singer (died 2018)
 September 12 - Sascha Klein, German swimmer
 November 9 - Denise Schindler, German Paralympic cyclist
 November 15 - Claas Relotius, German journalist who admitted numerous instances of journalistic fraud
 November 18 - Melanie Behringer, German footballer
 November 21 - Nadine Müller, German athlete
 December 24 - Christina Schwanitz, German shot putter

Deaths

 February 10 - Werner Hinz, German actor (born 1903)
 April 10 - Klaus Scholder, ecclesiastical historian (born 1930)
 March 29 - Gerhard Stöck, German athlete (born 1911)
 May 8 - Karl Marx, German composer (born 1897)
 May 21 - Kurt Waitzmann, German actor (born 1905)
 May 30 - Gustav Jaenecke, German ice hockey player (born 1908)
 April 6  - Mark Lothar, German composer (born 1902)
 April 7 - Carl Schmitt. German jurist and political theorist (born 1888)
 June 29 - Walter Rudi Wand, German judge (born 1928)
 July 16 - Heinrich Böll, German writer (born 1917)
 August 2 - Karl Heinz Stroux, German actor, theatre and filmdirector (born 1908)
 September 22 - Axel Springer, German journalist (born 1912)
 October 2 - Alex Möller, German politician (born 1903)
 November 12 - Willi Dehnkamp, German politician (born 1903)
 December 2 - Heinz Hoffmann, German politician (born 1910)
 December 26 - Margarete Schön, German actress (born 1895)

References

Links

 
Years of the 20th century in Germany
1980s in Germany
Germany
Germany